Trendspotting is the identification of new trends. It also may refer to:

Trendspotting, recurring segment of The Daily Show
Trendspotting, British fashion and culture magazine

See also
 Coolhunting